The  were a class of destroyer built for the Imperial Japanese Navy (IJN) in the late stages of World War II. Although sometimes termed Destroyer escorts, they were larger and more capable than contemporary United States Navy destroyer escorts or the Imperial Japanese Navy kaibōkan vessels.

Background
Even by 1942, the Imperial Japanese Navy General Staff realized that attrition of its destroyer force was not sustainable. There was a growing need for a simplified design which could be quickly mass-produced, and which could serve primarily as convoy escorts and as destroyer-transports in front-line locations, but would still be capable of working with the fleet if necessary. Emphasis was placed on anti-aircraft guns and anti-submarine weapons, and radar, as operations against surface targets was deemed unlikely. Forty-two vessels were ordered and work began in August 1943. 

The Tachibana-class had straight lines and a modular construction to facilitate mass-production. The Imperial Japanese Navy had plans to build another hundred and twelve Tachibana-class vessels, but only fourteen were completed before construction was cancelled, with resources diverted to "special-attack units".

Design
The Matsu-class destroyers displaced  standard with a length of  overall. The engine could develop only , which gave the vessels a top speed of just under . The boiler and the machinery rooms were separated to improve on survivability to combat damage.

The class was well armed for a ship of its size. The main battery was the 12.7 cm/40 Type 89 naval gun used as a primary anti-aircraft gun on many Japanese capital ships. A single gun was located forward with an anti-spray shield rather than a gun turret, and a dual mount was located aft with no protection at all. However, the lack of a high-angle fire-control director limited the anti-aircraft effectiveness of these weapons. Each vessel also had a quadruple torpedo launcher with Type 93 torpedoes, but no reloads.

Further anti-aircraft protection was provided by four Type 96 AA gun triple-mounts and eight single-mounts and both a Type 22 and Type 13 radar. The number of single-mounts was increased on certain individual vessels to thirteen. For anti-submarine warfare, each vessel also had two Type 94 depth charge projectors with 48 depth charges.

The Tachibana-class, entering service in 1945, had the same armament as the Matsu-class, but initially with 13 single-mount Type 96s instead of eight. This was later increased to as many as 19. Only one vessel, was modified to launch a single kaiten manned torpedo from her stern, although there were plans to covert another 11 to this configuration just before the war came to an end.

Operational history
Matsu-class destroyers were assigned to Destroyer Divisions 43, 52, and 53. Few Matsu-class units saw extensive service beyond Japanese home waters, and none of the Tachibana-class.

Matsu and Tachibana classes comparison

Ships of the classes
Forty-two vessels were ordered in Fiscal Year 1943 under the Modified 5th Naval Armaments Supplement Programme as #5481-#5522. Eighteen of these were completed to the original Matsu design, but the other twenty-four were altered to a modified (simplified) design which became known as the Tachibana class. Eight of this batch were completed to that design, while orders for sixteen were subsequently cancelled (of which eleven had not been laid down).

Another thirty-two vessels were authorised in Fiscal Year 1944 under the Wartime Naval Armaments Supplement Programme as #4801-#4832, all to the Tachibana design. Six of this batch were completed to that design, while another four were ordered and laid down but were subsequently cancelled on 17 April 1945; the remaining twenty-two were never ordered.

A further eighty vessels were projected in Fiscal Year 1945 to a further modification of the design, known as the Kai-Tachibana class, but no orders were placed before the end of the war brought an end to the programme.

Notes

Bibliography

, History of Pacific War Vol.43 Matsu class destroyers, Gakken (Japan), November 2003, 
, History of Pacific War Vol.51 The truth of Imperial Japanese Vessels Histories 2, Gakken (Japan), August 2005, 
Collection of writings by Sizuo Fukui Vol.5, Stories of Japanese Destroyers, Kōjinsha (Japan) 1993, 
Model Art Extra No.340, Drawings of Imperial Japanese Naval Vessels Part-1, Model Art Co. Ltd. (Japan), October 1989, Book code 08734-10
Daiji Katagiri, Ship Name Chronicles of the Imperial Japanese Navy Combined Fleet, Kōjinsha (Japan), June 1988, 
The Maru Special, Japanese Naval Vessels No.41 Japanese Destroyers I, Ushio Shobō (Japan), July 1980, Book code 68343-42
Fitzsimons, Bernard, general editor. Illustrated Encyclopedia of Weapons and Warfare, Volume 17, p. 1854, "Matsu". London: Phoebus Publishing, 1978.

External links

 Matsu class at CombinedFleet.com
 Matsu Class notes by Allyn Nevitt

 
Destroyer classes